Schermbeck is a municipality in the district of Wesel, in North Rhine-Westphalia, Germany.

Geography
Schermbeck is situated near the river Lippe, approximately 20 km east of Wesel, and 8 km north-west of Dorsten.  Its maximum dilatation from north to south is about 12.90 km, from west to east it's about 17.80 km. Thanks to its proximity to the Ruhr area and thus to many big cities, Schermbeck is becoming a popular place for people who want to escape the urban life but still be closely connected to it.

Gallery

General information
Schermbeck has 3 schools. Locally it is famous for its traditional annual "Volksfest" Kilian, at which many people from the surrounding areas attend. Recently it is becoming a popular location for various events like cooking and art exhibitions.

Division of the municipality
Schermbeck is divided into 8 districts:
 Altschermbeck
 Bricht
 Damm
 Dämmerwald
 Gahlen
 Overbeck
 Schermbeck
 Weselerwald

Transport

Roads
Schermbeck is connected to the highways A 3 and A 31 and also to the federal road B 58.

Through Schermbeck run 3,10 km highway, 17,40 km federal roads, 22,10 km ordinary highways, 165,20 km rural roads and 2,30 km are in privat property.

Religion
Out of ancient background Schermbeck is almost half catholic and half evangelic. The proportion of Catholics is about 45,3%, and 39,2% confess themselves as Protestants. There are only a few followers of other religions or denominations.

References

External links
  
 Private website about Üfte 
 Holocaust survivor testimony of the Kristallnacht pogrom in Schermbeck on the Yad Vashem website

Wesel (district)